Schloss Seehof is a Schloss (palace) in Memmelsdorf, Bamberg, Germany. It was built from 1684 to 1695 as a summer residence and hunting lodge for Marquard Sebastian Schenk von Stauffenberg, Prince-bishop of Bamberg.

Location
Schloss Seehof is located outside of Memmelsdorf in the district of Bamberg, around 5 kilometers northeast of the town of Bamberg in the Upper Franconia region of Bavaria, Germany.

History
Marquard Sebastian Schenk von Stauffenberg, Prince-bishop of Bamberg, enjoyed the rural area around Memmelsdorf. He thus asked  to replace a local estate from the late 15th century with an early Baroque palace. This was built between 1684 and 1695.

Later redesigns included the White Hall in the west wing, created during the reign of Johann Philipp Anton von Franckenstein in the 1750s.

Description
The palace is located in a large park and stands on a square plan, much like Schloss Johannisburg at Aschaffenburg. The four corner pavilions are topped by squat octagonal towers with prominent slate roof hoods featuring pierced ball ornaments. The facades are heavily segmented by large windows (with triangular gables on the ground floor and arches on the upper floor). Each row of windows is supported by a cornice. The inner court features two small clock towers and an arcade that surrounds it on the ground floor on all four sides.

The interior mostly dates from the 1730s. Balthasar Neumann and J.J.M. Küchel were involved in the designs. The palace chapel on the ground floor contains a Rococo altar that was made out of stucco by  based on a drawing by Küchel. The altar painting is  Die Heiligen drei Könige (the Three Magi) by Johann Rottenhammer (c. 1600). The centre part of the upper floor is occupied by a Baroque flight of rooms with the Rokokosaal in the middle. Its walls were covered by gypsum "marble" and reliefs painted by F.A. Decourt. The ceiling has a painting by Giuseppe Appiani, showing the goddess of the dawn (1752).

The park is today quite different in appearance than originally, when it was laid out during the reign of Lothar Franz von Schönborn in the early 18th century, since the ponds, cascades and fountains were all drained in 1803-6, after the water pipe from the  had been cut. Most of the around 400 figures created by the sculptors Ferdinand Tietz, Gollwitzer and Trautmann in the 1760s were destroyed or sold following secularization. Some of these groups are today scattered around the Bamberg area or were taken to the Germanisches Nationalmuseum at Nuremberg. Today, a few have been returned and are on display in the western Orangerie. In the 1960s and 1970s vases and benches were sold off to private buyers. After 1995, the park was restored, including the cascade. Access to the park is by five ornamental wrought-iron gates, flanked by two guard houses which were built by Küchel. The six pillars are topped by lions and vases created by Peter Benkert. The smaller entry from the village is due to B. Neumann and Küchel. The sweeping Orangeries were used by Adam Friedrich von Seinsheim in the 1770s for staging plays. At the time, the guest rooms in the western wing still had a direct view of the Neue Residenz at Bamberg. The park features hornbeam hedges that are over 300 years old and groves of 250-year old linden trees.

Today
The palace is administered by the Bavarian Administration of State-Owned Palaces, Gardens and Lakes. It is partially open to the public. Most of the building is occupied by the Bayerisches Landesamt für Denkmalpflege. A total of nine representative period rooms are open to the public. The chapel is available for weddings and some of the palace rooms can be rented for private events.

References

Further reading
  Berthold Fiedler: Die Kaskade im Park des Schlosses Seehof. Wiederherstellung 1983–1995. Festschrift anlässlich der Feierstunde am 22. Juli 1995. Landbauamt Bamberg, Bamberg 1995.
 Klaus Grewe: Die Kaskade von Schloss Seehof in Memmelsdorf und ihre aufwendige Wasserleitung. In: Frontinus-Gesellschaft e.V. (ed.): Wasser im Barock. von Zabern, Mainz 2004, p. 133–147 (Geschichte der Wasserversorgung 6).
 Uta Hasekamp: Die Schlösser und Gärten des Lothar Franz von Schönborn. Das Stichwerk nach Salomon Kleiner. Wernersche Verlagsanstalt, Worms 2005, p. 48–51 (Grüne Reihe. Quellen und Forschungen zur Gartenkunst 24).
 Michael Petzet, Emil Bauer: Schloß Seehof. Sommerresidenz der Bamberger Fürstbischöfe. Verlag Fränkischer Tag, Bamberg 1995, .
  Alfred Schelter, Michael Petzet: Schloss und Park Seehof. Bamberg, Memmelsdorf. Amtlicher Führer. Bayerische Schlösserverwaltung, München 2005, .

External links

 Official website

Buildings and structures completed in 1696
Palaces in Bavaria
Buildings and structures in Bamberg (district)
1696 establishments in the Holy Roman Empire
Episcopal palaces in Germany